Heather Pamela McKay (née Blundell)  (born 31 July 1941) is a retired Australian squash player, who is considered by many to be the greatest female player in the history of the game, and possibly also Australia's greatest-ever sportswoman. She dominated the women's squash game in the 1960s and 1970s, winning 16 consecutive British Open titles from 1962 to 1977, and capturing the inaugural women's World Open title in 1976, while remaining undefeated during that period. She was also a top-level player of other sports, including field hockey and racquetball.

Career
Heather Blundell was born in Queanbeyan, New South Wales. As Heather McKay, she completely dominated the sport of women's squash in the 1960s and '70s. She lost only two matches in her entire career (in 1960 and 1962), and was unbeaten in competitive squash matches from 1962 through to 1981, when she retired from active open squash. Her first defeat was in the quarterfinal of the New South Wales Championship in 1960, losing to Yvonne West; her second defeat was in the final of the Scottish Open in 1962, losing in straight games to Fran Marshall.

McKay won her first British Open (considered to be the effective world championship of the sport at the time) in 1962. She then won it again every year for the next 15 consecutive years, losing only two games at the championship during that time. She usually won her finals matches comfortably. In the 1968 championship, she won the final against her compatriot Bev Johnson without dropping a point.

In 1976, an unofficial world championship known as the Women's World Squash Championship was held in Brisbane, which McKay won by defeating Marion Jackman in the final 9–2, 9–2, 9–0. The first official women's World Open was held in 1979 in England, and McKay captured the inaugural title with a 6–9, 9–3, 9–1, 9–4 win over Sue Cogswell in the final.

McKay also won the Australian Amateur Championships for 14 consecutive times from 1960 to 1973.

When she retired in 1981 at the age of 40, McKay had gone nearly 20 years undefeated. Since retiring from the top-level game, she has remained active in international Masters level events, and has won two over-45 world championship titles and two over-50 world championship titles.

Heather also proved to be a talent in other sports, including field hockey, where she was a member of the Australian Women's Hockey Team in 1967 and 1971. In racquetball, she won the American Amateur Racquetball Championship once (1979), the American Professional Racquetball Championship three times (1980–81 and 1984), and the Canadian Racquetball Championship five times (1980 and 1982–85). She was inducted into the USA Racquetball Hall of Fame in 1997.

She was a teaching professional at the Toronto Squash Club in the 1980s. She worked with up-and-comer David Wright in an intensive Junior Program.

World Open

Finals: 2 (2 titles, 0 runner-up)

British Open

Finals: 16 (16 titles, 0 runner-up)

Note: Competed as Heather Blundell from 1962 to 1965.

After retirement

McKay wrote a book, Heather McKay's Complete Book of Squash, which was released in 1979. Staying active in squash, she was named coach of the Australian Institute of Sport's Squash Division in 1985. In 1999 she was one of the founder members of the Women's International Squash Players Association Hall of Fame, of which she herself was one of the first to be inducted.

Recognition
 1967 – ABC Sportsman of the Year
 1969 – Appointed Member of the Order of the British Empire (MBE) for services in sporting and international spheres.
 1979 – Appointed Member of the Order of Australia (AM) for services to the sport of squash.
 1985 – Sport Australia Hall of Fame inductee
 1997 – USA Racquetball Hall of Fame
 2000 – Australian Sports Medal
 Squash Australia Hall of Fame
 2018 – Appointed Officer of the Order of Australia (AO) for "distinguished service to squash as an elite player and coach, as a pioneer on the professional circuit, and through support for young athletes".

See also
 List of WISPA number 1 ranked players
 Official Women's Squash World Ranking
 Ladies Professional Racquetball Tour

Footnotes

External links
 
 Australian Australian Women’s Archives Project; life and career
 Whatever happened to squash? Radio National interview
 Oral History, National Library of Australia, 2006
 
 

1941 births
Living people
Australian female squash players
Members of the Order of Australia
Officers of the Order of Australia
Australian Members of the Order of the British Empire
Sport Australia Hall of Fame inductees
Australian Institute of Sport coaches
Recipients of the Australian Sports Medal
People from Queanbeyan
Sportswomen from New South Wales